Inman is a surname originating in England.  It usually originates from the Medieval English occupational word "Innman", and describes an innkeeper. The origin is the pre 7th century word "inn" meaning a lodging place where alcoholic beverages were served, plus "man", in this case a keeper or foreman. The first recording of the surname Inman is from the late 14th century, occupational surnames being among the first to be recorded but the last to be hereditary. They usually only became so when a son or sometimes a grandson in medieval England would follow their father into the same line of business. It has also been suggested that the surname derives from an Old English pre 7th century personal name Ingemund, a compound of "Ing", the name of a minor Norse god of fertility, plus "mund", protection.  Notable people with the surname include:

Arthur Crew Inman (1895–1963), American poet
Bobby Ray Inman (b. 1931), American admiral and intelligence officer
Bradden Inman (b. 1991), Australian footballer
Bradley Inman, American Internet entrepreneur
Charles Inman (1810–1899), American politician
Dontrelle Inman (born 1989), American football player
Douglas Inman (1920–2016), American oceanographer
Florence Elsie Inman (1891–1986), Canadian politician
Henry Inman (disambiguation), several people including
Henry Inman (Royal Navy officer) (1762–1809), British Royal Navy officer
Henry Inman (painter) (1801–1846), American painter
Henry Inman (police commander) (1816–1895), founder and commander of the South Australia Police
Henry Inman (U.S. Army officer and author) (1837-1899), U.S. soldier and author
Henry Inman (wrestler) (1886-1967), British wrestler
Ida Mary Inman (1894–1985), American feminist, political activist, and writer
Ira E. Inman (1868–1954), American farmer and politician
Jack C. Inman (1925–2015), American politician
Jeremy Inman, American voice actor
Jerry Inman (b. 1940), American football player
Joe Inman (b. 1947), American golfer
John Inman (1935–2007), English actor and singer 
John Inman (golfer) (b. 1962), American golfer and coach
Josh Inman (b. 1980), American rower
Matthew Inman (b. 1982), American cartoonist and creator of humor site The Oatmeal
Melbourne Inman (1878–1951), British billiards player
P. Inman (b. 1947), American poet
Philip Inman, 1st Baron Inman (1892–1979), British politician
Robert Inman (1931–2006), American educator, journalist, and author
Samuel M. Inman (1843–1915), American merchant
Scott Inman (b. 1978), American politician
Stu Inman (1926–2007), American basketball player, coach, and executive
William Inman (1825–1881) British ship-owner

See also
 Iman (surname)

References